The Clonoe Ambush was a military action between the British Army and the Provisional Irish Republican Army (IRA) that occurred during The Troubles in Northern Ireland. On 16 February 1992, an IRA unit attacked the Royal Ulster Constabulary security base in the village of Coalisland in County Tyrone, and was ambushed shortly afterwards by the Special Air Service (SAS) in the grounds of a church in the village of Clonoe whilst attempting to make its escape, resulting in several IRA fatalities.

Background

From 1985 onwards, the IRA in East Tyrone had been at the forefront of a campaign against British state police and army facilities and their personnel. In 1987, an East Tyrone IRA unit was ambushed with eight of its members being killed by the SAS while they were making an attack on a police station in Loughgall, County Armagh. This was the IRA's greatest loss of life in a single incident during The Troubles. Despite these losses, the IRA's campaign continued, with it attacking nearly 100 police and military facilities over the next five years, wrecking thirty three and damaging the remainder to varying degrees. The SAS ambush had no noticeable long-term effect on the level of IRA activity in East Tyrone. In the two years before the Loughgall ambush, the IRA killed seven people in East Tyrone and North Armagh, and eleven in the two years following the ambush.

Three other IRA members – Gerard Harte, Martin Harte and Brian Mullin – had been ambushed and killed by the SAS as they tried to kill an off-duty Ulster Defence Regiment soldier near Carrickmore, County Tyrone. British intelligence identified them as the perpetrators of the Ballygawley bus bombing, which killed eight British soldiers. After that bombing, all troops going on leave or returning from leave were ferried in and out of East Tyrone by helicopter. Another high-profile attack of the East Tyrone Brigade was carried out on 11 January 1990 near Augher, where a Gazelle helicopter was shot down.

On 3 June 1991, three IRA men, Lawrence McNally, Michael "Pete" Ryan and Tony Doris, were killed at the town of Coagh, when a stolen car they were driving in on their way to kill an off-duty Ulster Defence Regiment soldier was ambushed by the Special Air Service. Ryan was the same man who, according to Irish journalist and author Ed Moloney, had led an attack on Derryard checkpoint on the orders of IRA Army Council member 'Slab' Murphy two years earlier.

The IRA's East Tyrone Brigade lost 53 members killed by the British Forces during the Troubles – the highest of any "Brigade area". Of these, 28 were killed between 1987 and 1992.

The ambush
At 10.30 P.M. during the night of 16 February 1992, a stolen car and lorry carrying multiple IRA attackers drove into the centre of the village of Coalisland and, pulling up at its fortified Royal Ulster Constabulary security base, fired 30 rounds of armour-piercing tracer ammunition into it at close range from a Soviet Union made DSHK heavy machine-gun that they had mounted on the back of the lorry. The heavy machine gun was fired by IRA member Kevin O'Donnell, the rest of the unit being armed with Soviet made AKM assault rifles.  The IRA attackers then drove off at speed up Annagher hill, without any apparent pursuit from the security forces. Whilst making their escape they drove past the home of Tony Doris, an IRA man who had been killed by the British Army the previous year, where they stopped to fire into the air, shouting: "Up the 'RA, that's for Tony Doris!". Witnesses also reported the IRA men waving Irish Tricolours from the back of the lorry.
After this they drove on at speed to the car park of St. Patrick's Roman Catholic Church in the village of Clonoe, two miles away from Coalisland police station, arriving at 10.45 P.M., where getaway cars were waiting. Immediately on arrival, the IRA attackers were in the process of preparing to abandon the attack vehicles and dismounting the DShk to take with them when they were assailed by a British Army detachment that had been lying in wait for them in the car park's perimeter, primarily composed of soldiers from the Special Air Service, who engaged them with sustained automatic fire. Patrick Vincent (20 years of age), the driver of the stolen lorry, was shot dead with five bullets whilst still in its cab. Peter Clancy (19) (hit by ten bullets) and Kevin O'Donnell (21) (shot twice) were killed whilst dismounting the DShk on the back of the lorry. Sean O'Farrell (23) was pursued on foot across the church grounds over a distance of 100 yards before being shot dead with five bullets whilst trying to clamber over a fence. Two other IRA men, one of them being Aidan McKeever, who were found sitting in a car in the car park with the intention of acting as getaway drivers, surrendered after being wounded and were taken prisoner. The roof of the church was accidentally set on fire after a stray round hit a fuel storage tank. One British soldier was wounded during the confrontation. An IRA statement reported that another active service unit made up of at least four volunteers taking part in the operation at Coalisland "escaped unharmed" under heavy fire in other vehicles after splitting up into two teams.

Several witnesses to the ambush later claimed that some of the IRA men tried to surrender to the British Army engaging unit during the ambush, but were summarily executed. Mr Justice Treacy of Northern Ireland's High Court awarded McKeever, the IRA getaway driver, £75,000 in damages in 2011. It is unclear whether or not this decision was appealed, or whether the damages were ever paid.

Internal IRA criticism
A local IRA source pointed out areas of incompetence in the attack by the IRA unit involved that led to its destruction:

 The use of a long-range weapon for a short-range shooting. The DShK could be used up to 2,000 metres from the target, and its armour-piercing capabilities at 1,500 metres are still considerable.
 The use of tracer rounds was ill-judged as they easily reveal the firing location of the gun if it is not being fired from a well-hidden position.
The escape route was chosen at random, with the machine-gun in full sight and the support vehicle flashing its hazard lights.
The gathering of so many men at the same place after such an attack was another factor in the failure to escape for most of the attacking force.

Aftermath

During the funeral services for O'Donnell and O'Farrell in Coalisland, the parish priest criticised the security forces for what happened at Clonoe church, which had resulted in the deaths of the four IRA men. The priest, Fr. MacLarnon, then appealed to the IRA and Sinn Féin to replace "the politics of confrontation with the politics of cooperation". While Francis Molloy, a local Sinn Féin councillor, walked out of the church in protest, leading Sinn Féin politicians Gerry Adams and Martin McGuinness remained in their seats. There were hundreds of Royal Ulster Constabulary police officers outside the church during the funeral, the RUC having changed its policy after the Milltown Cemetery attack. This show of force was criticised by Sinn Féin.

This was the last occasion that IRA members were killed in a series of ambushes by the British Army, spearheaded by the Special Air Service, in Northern Ireland. Growing tension between locals and the British military foot-patrols led to street confrontations with soldiers from the Parachute Regiment three months later.

See also
Chronology of Provisional Irish Republican Army actions (1990-1999)
Coagh ambush
1993 Fivemiletown ambush
1997 Coalisland attack
East Tyrone Brigade
Technical (vehicle)

Notes

References
McKittrick, David (1999). Lost lives. Mainstream. 
O'Brien, Brendan (1999). The Long War: The IRA and Sinn Féin, Syracuse University Press. 

1992 in Northern Ireland
Coalisland
British Army in Operation Banner
Deaths by firearm in Northern Ireland
Military actions and engagements during the Troubles (Northern Ireland)
Military history of County Tyrone
Operations involving British special forces
People killed by security forces during The Troubles (Northern Ireland)
Provisional Irish Republican Army actions
Royal Ulster Constabulary
Special Air Service
The Troubles in County Tyrone
February 1992 events in the United Kingdom
1992 in military history
Attacks on military installations in the 1990s
Ambushes in Northern Ireland